Porodiscus  may refer to:
 Porodiscus (fungus), a fungi genus within the class Sordariomycetes
 Porodiscus (diatom), a genus of fossil diatom in the family Coscinodiscaceae
 Porodiscus (protist), a radiolarian protists genus in the family Spongodiscidae